Matthew Corrin (born 1982) is a Canadian businessman. He is the founder, chairman and former CEO of Freshii.

Early life
Corrin was born in Winnipeg, Manitoba in 1982. He attended St. John's-Ravenscourt School and the University of Western Ontario where he graduated with a Bachelor of Arts degree. After graduating, Corrin moved to New York City where he became an intern on the Late Show with David Letterman.

Career
Corrin worked in New York City for fashion designer Oscar de la Renta when he came across the fresh delis and wanted to create his own fresh food business. In 2005, he started Freshii with the first location opening in Toronto, Ontario.

In 2022, Corrin stepped down as CEO of Freshii to focus on a new venture, Percy, which outsources cashiers at restaurants via videoconferencing.

References

Canadian businesspeople
1982 births
University of Western Ontario alumni
Living people